Oblivious is the first single by the Japanese girl group Kalafina, with the two original members Wakana Ootaki and Keiko Kubota. All three tracks are used as theme songs in the first three Kara no Kyoukai movies.

Track listing
Catalog number: SECL-586
oblivious

Charts

References

2008 singles
Songs written by Yuki Kajiura
Kalafina songs
2008 songs
SME Records singles
Japanese film songs
Songs written for animated films